George Harmon Coxe wrote a total of 63 novels starting in 1935, the last being published in 1975.

References